Joseph Sherman Gerlach (June 29, 1913 – March 8, 1993) was an American football, basketball, baseball and ice hockey coach. He served as the head football coach at Dickinson State University from 1944 to 1945 and at Stout State College, now the University of Wisconsin–Stout, from 1956 to 1957, compiling a career college football record of 10–14–3.

Coaching career
Gerlach was the fourth head football coach for the Dickinson State Blue Hawks located in Dickinson, North Dakota and he held that position for two seasons, from 1944 until 1945. His coaching record at Dickinson State was 2–3–2.

References

External links
 

1913 births
1993 deaths
Alaska Nanooks men's basketball coaches
Alaska Nanooks men's ice hockey coaches
Baseball coaches from North Dakota
Basketball coaches from North Dakota
College men's basketball head coaches in the United States
Dickinson State Blue Hawks football coaches
Minnesota Duluth Bulldogs men's basketball coaches
Sportspeople from Grand Forks, North Dakota
Winona State Warriors baseball coaches
Winona State Warriors men's basketball coaches
Wisconsin Badgers baseball players
Wisconsin–Stout Blue Devils baseball coaches
Wisconsin–Stout Blue Devils football coaches
Wisconsin–Stout Blue Devils men's basketball coaches